Tori Zietsch known professionally as Maple Glider, is an Australian pop singer-songwriter from Melbourne, Australia. Maple Glider released her debut album in June 2021.

Early life
In 2020, Tori Zietsch said "I was raised from birth in quite a restrictive religious household" in Lismore, New South Wales. She moved to Melbourne to be "ensconced in the music community".

Career

2017: Seavera
Zietsch partnered up with childhood friend, producer Daniel Pinkerton and formed Seavera, pairing acoustic guitars with dramatic electronics. In late 2017 Seavera won the very first Pie School initiative and worked with the team from Pieater on recording a song that was recorded was never released, and Seavera parted ways soon after. Zietsch relocated to Brighton, England and began work on solo material.

2018–present: To Enjoy Is the Only Thing
Zietsch returned to Melbourne in late 2019 with numerous demos written while she was living in Brighton. She enlisted Tom Iansek to record, mix and produce the first batch of songs and was signed to Pieater.

In April 2021, Maple Glider announced the release of her debut studio album, alongside the third single "Swimming". In a press release, the artist said the album takes inspiration from vignettes of her life and the perspectives that travel has given her.

Discography

Studio albums

Singles

Awards and nominations

AIR Awards
The Australian Independent Record Awards (commonly known informally as AIR Awards) is an annual awards night to recognise, promote and celebrate the success of Australia's Independent Music sector.

! 
|-
| rowspan="2"| 2022
| Maple Glider
| Breakthrough Independent Artist of the Year
| 
| rowspan="2"| 
|-
| To Enjoy Is the Only Thing
| Best Independent Blues and Roots Album or EP
|

Music Victoria Awards
The Music Victoria Awards, are an annual awards night celebrating Victorian music. They commenced in 2005.

! 
|-
|rowspan="3"| 2021
|rowspan="3"| Maple Glider
| Best Breakthrough Act
| 
|rowspan="3"| 
|-
| Best Solo Act
| 
|-
| Best Folk Act
|

References

External links
 

1997 births
21st-century Australian singers
21st-century Australian women singers
Australian women pop singers
Living people
Partisan Records artists